The ottu (or otter) is a double reed wind instrument, used in Carnatic music of Southern India to provide a drone accompaniment to the similar nadaswaram oboe. Like the nadaswaram, the ottu is a large conical instrument, some two and a half feet long. Unlike the nadaswaram, the ottu has no fingerholes, being intended to produce one constant note while playing. It is provided with several small tuning holes which can be stopped with wax to modify its note.
In some cases, a shruti box may be used in place of the ottu due to its steadier sound.
The player holds the instrument in their left hand, sustaining the sound by inhaling through their nose, and with the right hand, beats on a drum strapped onto a belt.

References

Further reading

Images from The Beede Gallery: Shawms (Ottu and Nagaswaram), Southern India, ca. 1900-1940. National Music Museum, University of South Dakota.

Carnatic music instruments
Single oboes with conical bore